Karl-August may refer to:

Adam Karl August von Eschenmayer (1768–1852), German philosopher and physician
Christian Karl August Ludwig von Massenbach (1758–1827), Prussian soldier
Eduard Karl August Riehm (1830–1888), German Protestant theologian
Friedrich Karl August, Prince of Waldeck and Pyrmont (1743–1812), Prince of Waldeck and Pyrmont
Hans Karl August Simon von Euler-Chelpin (1873–1964), German-born Swedish biochemist
Johann Karl August Musäus (1735–1787), German author from Jena
Karl August, 10th Prince of Thurn and Taxis (1898–1982), tenth Prince of Thurn and Taxis
Karl August, Grand Duke of Saxe-Weimar-Eisenach (1757–1828), duke of Saxe-Weimar and of Saxe-Eisenach
Karl August, Hereditary Grand Duke of Saxe-Weimar-Eisenach (1844–1894), Hereditary Grand Duke of Saxe-Weimar-Eisenach
Karl August, Prince of Waldeck and Pyrmont (1704–1763), Prince of Waldeck and Pyrmont
Karl August Alten (1764–1840), Hanoverian and British soldier
Karl August Auberlen (1824–1864), German Lutheran theologian
Karl August Bottiger (1760–1835), German archaeologist and classicist
Karl August Devrient (1797–1872), German stage actor
Karl August Ehrensvard (1745–1800), Swedish naval officer, painter, author, and neo-classical architect
Karl August Einbund (1888–1942), Estonian journalist, politician and head of state
Karl August Engelbrekt Ahlqvist (1826–1889), Finnish poet, scholar of the Finno-Ugric language, author, literary critic
Karl August Ferdinand von Borcke (1776–1830), Prussian general, first recipient of the Iron Cross
Karl August Folkers (1906–1997), American biochemist, working at Merck
Karl August Friedrich Mahn (1802–1887), German philologist and language teacher and researcher
Karl August Genzken (1885–1957), physician, conducted human experiments on prisoners of concentration camps
Karl August Görner (1806–1884), German actor, director and playwright
Karl August Hanke (1903–1945), official of the National Socialist German Workers Party (Nazi Party)
Karl August Haraldsen (1889–1959), Norwegian merchant
Karl August Hase (1800–1890), German Protestant theologian and Church historian
Karl August Katzer (1822–1904), Sorbian composer and conductor
Karl August Lossen (1841–1893), German petrologist and geologist
Karl August Mobius (1825–1908), German zoologist
Karl August Nerger (1875–1947), naval officer of the Imperial German Navy in World War I
Karl August Nicander (1799–1839), Swedish lyric poet
Karl August Offman (born 1940), Mauritian politician
Karl August Otto Hoffmann (1853–1909), German botanist and a high school teacher in Berlin
Karl August Ramsay (1791–1855), Finnish politician
Karl August Reinhold Wunderlich (1815–1877), German physician, pioneer psychiatrist, medical professor
Karl August Steinheil (1801–1870), German physicist, inventor, engineer and astronomer
Karl August Varnhagen von Ense (1785–1858), German biographer, diplomat and soldier
Karl August von Bergen (1704–1759), German anatomist and botanist
Karl August von Hardenberg (1750–1822), Prussian statesman and Prime Minister of Prussia
Karl August von Heigel (1835–1905), German novelist
Karl August Wilhelm Frenzel (1911–1996), the commandant of Sobibor extermination camp's Lager I section
Karl August Wittfogel (1896–1988), German-American playwright, historian, and sinologist
Karl August Wuensche (1838–1912), German Christian Hebraist
Karl-August Fagerholm (1901–1984), Speaker of Parliament and three times Prime Minister of Finland
Karl-August Freiherr von Bülow (1904–1986), highly decorated Oberst in the Wehrmacht during World War II
Karl-August von Reisach (1800–1869), German Catholic theologian and Cardinal
Kraft Karl August zu Hohenlohe-Ingelfingen (1827–1892), Prussian general and military writer
Max Karl August Bruch (1838–1920), German Romantic composer and conductor

See also
Carl August (disambiguation)
Charles August